The 2021–22 EFL Cup was the 62nd season of the EFL Cup (known as the Carabao Cup for sponsorship reasons). The competition was open to all clubs participating in the Premier League and the English Football League.

The winner of the competition qualifies for the play-off round of the 2022–23 UEFA Europa Conference League.

The competition began on 31 July 2021, and the final was played at Wembley Stadium on 27 February 2022 between Chelsea and Liverpool, with Liverpool winning a record ninth title 11–10 on penalties following a goalless draw after extra time.

Manchester City were the holders, having won the previous four editions, but they were eliminated by West Ham United on penalties in the fourth round.

Access
All 92 clubs in the Premier League and English Football League entered the season's EFL Cup. Access was distributed across the top 4 leagues of the English football league system. For the first two rounds, the draw was regionalised into northern and southern clubs.

In the first round, 22 of 24 Championship clubs, and all League One and League Two clubs entered.

The following round, the two remaining Championship clubs, who finished 18th and 19th in the 2020–21 Premier League season (Fulham and West Bromwich Albion), and the Premier League clubs not involved in either the Champions League, Europa League, or Europa Conference League entered.

First round
A total of 70 clubs played in the first round: 24 from League Two (tier 4), 24 from League One (tier 3), and 22 from the Championship (tier 2). The draw for this round was split on a geographical basis into 'northern' and 'southern' sections. Teams were drawn against a team from the same section.

Northern section

Southern section

Second round
A total of 50 clubs played in the second round: the 35 winners from the first round, the 2 clubs from the Championship (tier 2) who did not enter in the first round, plus the 13 Premier League clubs who were not in European competition. The draw for this round was split on a geographical basis into 'northern' and 'southern' sections. Teams were drawn against a team from the same section. The draw was held on 11 August 2021 after the conclusion of the first round tie between Leyton Orient and Queens Park Rangers, live on Sky Sports and it was made by Andy Townsend and Jobi McAnuff at 21:15 BST.

Northern section

Southern section

Third round
A total of 32 teams played in the third round. Chelsea, Leicester City, Liverpool, Manchester City, Manchester United, Tottenham Hotspur, and West Ham United entered in this round due to their participation in either the 2021–22 UEFA Champions League, the 2021–22 UEFA Europa League, or the 2021–22 UEFA Europa Conference League. The draw was made on 25 August 2021 live on Sky Sports after the conclusion of the second round tie between West Bromwich Albion vs Arsenal by Kevin Phillips and Kevin Campbell. Unlike the previous rounds this round was not split into northern and southern sections. Tiebreakers were decided by penalty. 

Oldham Athletic and Rochdale were the lowest level teams that were still in the competition.

Fourth round
A total of 16 teams played in this round. The ties were played during the week commencing 25 October 2021. League One side Sunderland were the only team from the third division or lower left in the competition.

Quarter-finals
A total of eight teams played in this round. The draw was held on 30 October 2021. The ties were played during the week commencing 20 December 2021. League One side Sunderland were the only team from outside the Premier League left in the competition.

Semi-finals
A total of four teams, all of which were from the Premier League, played in this round. The draw was held on 22 December 2021.

This season saw the return of double-legged semi-finals as with the 2019–20 EFL Cup after the 2020–21 EFL Cup semi-finals were played over a single leg due to fixture congestion caused by the COVID-19 pandemic. The first and second legs were originally scheduled to be played during the weeks commencing 3 January 2022 and 10 January 2022, respectively. However, on 5 January 2022, the EFL postponed the first-leg match between Arsenal and Liverpool, originally scheduled for 6 January 2022, to 13 January 2022, due to a COVID-19 outbreak among Liverpool's players and staff. This also led to a switch to Liverpool home for the first leg, and Arsenal home for the second leg on 20 January 2022.

Chelsea won 3–0 on aggregate.

Liverpool won 2–0 on aggregate.

Final

Chelsea played Liverpool in the final, which was held on 27 February 2022. This saw the return of the EFL Cup Final to its February slot as with the 2020 EFL Cup Final, as the 2021 EFL Cup Final was played in April so that spectators could attend due to COVID-19 restrictions in England. It was played at Wembley Stadium in Wembley in the London Borough of Brent. The winner qualifies for the 2022–23 UEFA Europa Conference League unless they have qualified for the 2022–23 UEFA Champions League or 2022–23 UEFA Europa League.

Top goalscorers

Notes

References

EFL Cup seasons
EFL Cup
EFL Cup
Cup